Vvedenskoye is a rural locality in Shumakovsky Selsoviet Rural Settlement, Kursky District, Kursk Oblast, Russia. Population:

Geography 
The village is located on the Mlodat River (a left tributary of the Seym), 96 km from the Russia–Ukraine border, 10 km south-east of the district center – the town Kursk, 1 km from the selsoviet center – Bolshoye Shumakovo.

 Climate
Vvedenskoye has a warm-summer humid continental climate (Dfb in the Köppen climate classification).

Transport 
Vvedenskoye is located on the road of regional importance  (Kursk – Bolshoye Shumakovo – Polevaya via Lebyazhye), in the vicinity of the railway station Konaryovo (railway line Klyukva — Belgorod).

The rural locality is situated 10 km from Kursk Vostochny Airport, 114 km from Belgorod International Airport and 198 km from Voronezh Peter the Great Airport.

References

Notes

Sources

Rural localities in Kursky District, Kursk Oblast